Andrius Skerla (born 29 April 1977) is a Lithuanian professional football coach and a former defender. He is the manager of A Lyga club Hegelmann. He began his career in Lithuania with Žalgiris Vilnius, where his performances drew the attention of Dutch club PSV. After making only 25 appearances for PSV, Skerla was signed by Dunfermline Athletic in 2000. He spent five seasons with the club playing in almost 200 matches for the Pars, including the 2004 Scottish Cup Final where he scored in the 3–1 defeat against Celtic.

After leaving Dunfermline in 2005, his later career saw him return east, playing for Russian side Tom Tomsk, Vėtra in Lithuania, Polish clubs Korona Kielce and Jagiellonia Białystok, before finishing his career with his home-town team, Žalgiris Vilnius.

Skerla was Lithuania's most capped player of all time with 84 appearances, until he was surpassed by Saulius Mikoliūnas in September 2020.

Club career

Early career
Born in Vilnius, Skerla started his career at local club Žalgiris Vilnius in 1995, before Dutch club PSV Eindhoven signed him in 1996. After an unsuccessful spell in the Netherlands, Skerla signed for SPL side Dunfermline Athletic.

Dunfermline Athletic
Skerla's time at Dunfermline was his most successful period of football. He was signed in 2000 by new manager Jimmy Calderwood and was immediately put into the starting line up. After a successful first season at Dunfermline he was linked with numerous clubs including Scottish club Glasgow Rangers, but Skerla insisted he wanted to stay at East End Park. Skerla will most probably be remembered by the Pars fans, for scoring Dunfermline's only goal in the 2004 Scottish Cup Final defeat against Celtic.

Tom Tomsk
In March 2005, Skerla announced he wished to leave Dunfermline as he decided to look for new challenges. After Russian side Rubin Kazan had a bid failed because it did not meet Dunfermline's valuation of the player, Skerla re-iterated his decision that he wanted to move and eventually he moved to Tom Tomsk for £200,000.

FK Vetra
After leaving Dunfermline for Russia, Skerla played for Lithuanian side FK Vėtra.

Korona Kielce
Later he played for Ekstraklasa team Korona Kielce.

Jagiellonia Białystok
Skerla played for Ekstraklasa side Jagiellonia Białystok. Skerla scored in the 2010 Polish Cup Final for Jagiellonia, helping them to secure their first senior trophy, as well as ensure they would compete in European competition for the first time in the 2010–11 season.

International career
Skerla marked his 50th appearance for Lithuania on 7 October 2006 with a first international goal against the Faroe Islands. Skerla retired from International football on 11 October 2011 after a defeat to Czech Republic.

Honours
Žalgiris Vilnius
 A Lyga: 2013
 Lithuanian Supercup: 2013
 Lithuanian Football Cup: 1996–97, (2011–12, 2012–13

PSV Eindhoven
 Eredivisie: 1999–2000

Jagiellonia Białystok
 Polish Cup: 2009–10
 Polish SuperCup: 2010

References

External links

 
 Andrius Skerla career stats at jagiellonia.neostrada.pl
 
 

1977 births
Living people
Association football defenders
Lithuanian footballers
Lithuania international footballers
PSV Eindhoven players
Dunfermline Athletic F.C. players
FC Tom Tomsk players
Korona Kielce players
Jagiellonia Białystok players
FK Žalgiris players
A Lyga players
Eredivisie players
Russian Premier League players
Scottish Premier League players
Lithuanian expatriate footballers
Lithuanian expatriate sportspeople in the Netherlands
Expatriate footballers in the Netherlands
Lithuanian expatriate sportspeople in Scotland
Expatriate footballers in Scotland
Lithuanian expatriate sportspeople in Russia
Expatriate footballers in Russia
Lithuanian expatriate sportspeople in Poland
Expatriate footballers in Poland
Lithuanian football managers
A Lyga managers